The institution of slavery in North America existed from the earliest years of the colonial history of the United States until 1865 when the Thirteenth Amendment permanently abolished slavery throughout the entire United States. It was also abolished among the sovereign Indian tribes in Indian Territory by new peace treaties which the US required after the Civil War.

For most of the seventeenth and part of the eighteenth centuries, male slaves outnumbered female slaves, making the two groups' experiences in the colonies distinct. Living and working in a wide range of circumstances and regions, African-American women and men encountered diverse experiences of enslavement. With increasing numbers of kidnapped African women, as well as those born into slavery in the colonies, slave sex ratios leveled out between 1730 and 1750. "The uniqueness of the African-American female's situation is that she stands at the crossroads of two of the most well-developed ideologies in America, that regarding women and that regarding the Negro." Living both female and black identities, enslaved African women faced both racism and sexism.

Colonial America

Virginia

From 1700 to 1740 an estimated 43,000 slaves were imported into Virginia, and almost all but 4,000 were imported directly from Africa. Recent scholarship suggests that the number of women and men imported in this period was more or less equal and included a high number of children. As most were from West Africa, its cultures were central in the mid to late eighteenth-century slave life in Virginia.  African values were prevalent and West African women's cultures had strong representations. Some prevalent cultural representations were the deep and powerful bonds between mother and child, and among women within the larger female community. Among the Igbo ethnic group in particular (from present-day Nigeria), which comprised between one-third and one-half of incoming slaves in the early eighteenth century, female authority (the omu) "ruled on a wide variety of issues of importance to women in particular and the community as a whole."  The Igbo represented one group of people brought to the Chesapeake, but in general, Africans came from an extremely diverse range of cultural backgrounds. All came from worlds where women's communities were strong,  and were introduced into a patriarchal and violently racist and exploitative society; white men typically characterized all black women as passionately sexual, to justify their sexual abuse and miscegenation.

Virginia girls, much less black girls, were not educated, and most were illiterate. African and African American female slaves occupied a broad range of positions. The southern colonies were majorly agrarian societies and enslaved women provided labor in the fields, planting and doing chores, but mostly in the domestic sphere, nursing, taking care of children, cooking, laundering, etc.

New England 

Historian Ira Berlin distinguished between "slave societies" and "societies with slaves." New England was considered to be a society with slaves, dependent on maritime trade and diversified agriculture, in contrast to the slave societies of the south, which were "socially, economically, and politically dependent on slave labor, had a large enslaved population, and allowed masters extensive power over their slaves unchecked by the law."  New England had a small slave population and masters thought of themselves as patriarchs with the duty to protect, guide, and care for their slaves. Enslaved women in New England had greater opportunity to seek freedom than in other regions because of "the New England legal system, the frequency of manumission by owners, and chances for hiring out, especially among enslaved men, who seized the opportunity to earn enough money to purchase a wife and children."

Enslaved women largely occupied traditional "women's work" roles and were often hired out by the day. They worked mainly as maids, in the kitchen, the barn, and the garden. They did menial and servile tasks: polished family silver or furniture, helped with clothes and hair, drew baths, barbered the men, and completed menial domestic chores like sweeping, emptying chamber pots, carrying gallons of water a day, washing the dishes, brewing, looking after young children and the elderly, cooking and baking, milking the cows, feeding the chickens, spinning, knitting, carding, sewing, and laundering.  Their daily work was less demanding than the field labor of enslaved women in other regions. Nonetheless, enslaved women in New England worked hard, often under poor living conditions and malnutrition. "As a result of heavy work, poor housing conditions, and inadequate diet, the average black woman did not live past forty."

Enslaved women were given to white women as gifts from their husbands, and as wedding and Christmas gifts.  The idea that New England masters treated their slaves with greater kindness in comparison to southern slave owners is a myth. They had little mobility freedom and lacked access to education and any training. "The record of slaves who were branded by their owners, had their ears nailed, fled, committed suicide, suffered the dissolution of their families, or were sold secretly to new owners in Barbados in the last days of the Revolutionary War before they become worthless seems sufficient to refute the myth of kindly masters. They lashed out at their slaves when they were angry, filled with rage, or had convenient access to horsewhip."  Female slaves were sometimes forced by their masters into sexual relationships with enslaved men for the purpose of forced breeding. It was also not uncommon for enslaved women to be raped and in some cases impregnated by their masters.

Southern colonies 
Regardless of location, slaves endured hard and demeaning lives, but labor in the southern colonies was most severe. The southern colonies were slave societies; they were "socially, economically, and politically dependent on slave labor, had a large enslaved population, and allowed masters extensive power over their slaves unchecked by the law."  Plantations were the economic power structure of the South, and male and female slave labor was its foundation. Early on, slaves in the South worked primarily in agriculture, on farms and plantations growing indigo, rice, and tobacco; cotton became a major crop after the 1790s. Female slaves worked in a wide variety of capacities. They were expected to do field work as well as have children, and in this way increase the slave population. In the years before the American Revolution, the female slave population grew mainly as a result of natural increase and not importation. "Once slaveholders realized that the reproductive function of the female slave could yield a profit, the manipulation of procreative sexual relations became an integral part of the sexual exploitation of female slaves."  Many slave women raised their children without much assistance from males. Enslaved women were counted on not only to do their house and fieldwork, but also to bear, nourish, and rear the children whom slaveholders sought to continually replenish their labor force.  As house slaves, women were domestic servants: cooking, sewing, acting as maids, and rearing the planter's children. Later on, they were used in many factories, instrumental in the development of the United States, where they were kept at lower maintenance costs.

Revolutionary era

During the Revolutionary War (1775–83) enslaved women served on both sides, the Loyalist army as well as the Patriots, as nurses, laundresses, and cooks. But as historian Carol Berkin writes, "African American loyalties were to their own future, not to Congress or to the king."  Enslaved women could be found in army camps and as camp followers. They worked building roads, constructing fortifications, and laundering uniforms, "but they remained slaves rather than refugees. Masters usually hired these women out to the military, sometimes hiring out their children as well."  Enslaved women could also be found working in the shops, homes, fields, and plantations of every American colony. It is estimated that by 1770, there were more than 47,000 enslaved blacks in the northern colonies, almost 20,000 of them in New York. More than 320,000 slaves worked in the Chesapeake colonies, making 37 percent of the population of the region African or African American. Over 187,000 of these slaves were in Virginia. In the Lower South, there were more than 92,000 slaves. South Carolina alone had over 75,000 slaves, and by 1770 planters there were importing 4,000 Africans a year. In many counties in the Lower South, the slave population outnumbered the white.

Although service in the military did not guarantee enslaved people their freedom, black men had the opportunity to escape slavery by enlisting in the army. During the disruption of war, both men and women ran away. Men were more likely to escape, as pregnant women, mothers, and women who nursed their elderly parents or friends seldom abandoned those who depended on them.  So many slaves deserted their plantations in South Carolina, that there were not enough field hands to plant or harvest crops. As food grew scarce, the blacks who remained behind suffered from starvation or enemy attack. The Crown issued certificates of manumission to more than 914 women as a reward for serving with Loyalist forces.  But many women who had won their freedom lost it again "through violence and trickery and the venality of men entrusted with their care."  Others who managed to secure their freedom faced racial prejudice, discrimination, and poverty. When loyalist plantations were captured, enslaved women were often taken and sold for the soldiers' profit. The Crown did keep promising manumission slaves, evacuating them along with troops in the closing days of the war, and resettling more than 3,000 Black Loyalists in Nova Scotia, and others in the Caribbean, and England. In 1792 it established Freetown, in what is now Sierra Leone, as a colony for Poor Blacks from London, as well as Black Loyalists from Canada who wanted to relocate.

One of the most well-known voices for freedom around the Revolutionary era was Phillis Wheatley of Massachusetts. She was a slave for most of her life but was given freedom by her master. Educated in Latin, Greek, and English, Wheatley wrote a collection of poems that asserted that Africans, as children of God just like Europeans, deserved respect and freedom.

In 1777, Vermont drafted a state constitution that prohibited the institution of slavery. In 1780 Massachusetts a state judge declared slavery to be unconstitutional according to the state's new bill of rights, which declared "all men...free and equal." Slavery effectively ended in Massachusetts with this ruling in a freedom suit by Quock Walker. This led to an increase in enslaved men and women suing for their freedom in New England. Also in 1780 in Pennsylvania, the legislature enacted "a gradual emancipation law that directly connected the ideals of the Revolution with the rights of the African Americans to freedom."  In the South, the immediate legacy of the Revolution was increased manumission by slaveholders in the first two decades after the war. But, the invention of the cotton gin enabled widespread cultivation of short-staple cotton, and with the opening up of southwestern lands to cotton and sugar production, demand for slaves increased. Legislatures made emancipation difficult to gain, and they passed harsher laws regulating African-American lives.

Antebellum Period

As historian Deborah Gray White explains, "Black in a white society, slave in a free society, woman in a society ruled by men, female slaves had the least formal power and were perhaps the most vulnerable group of Americans."

The mother-daughter relationship was often the most enduring and as such cherished within the African-American complex of relations.  Relatively few women were runaways, and when they did run, they sometimes escaped with their children.  Historian Martha Saxton writes about enslaved mothers' experiences in St. Louis in the antebellum period: "In Marion County, north of St. Louis, a slave trader bought three small children from an owner, but the children's mother killed them all and herself rather than let them be taken away. A St. Louis trader took a crying baby from its mother, both on their way to be sold, and made a gift of it to a white woman standing nearby because its noise was bothering him." Another way these generational connections can be seen, is through song. Often songs about slavery and women's experiences during their enslavement were passed down through generations. African-American Women Work Songs are historical snapshots of lived experience and survival. Songs speak of families being torn apart and the emotional turmoil that enslaved women were put through by slavery. Songs add the legacy of an oral tradition that fosters generational knowledge about historical periods. 
Little girls as young as seven were frequently sold away from their mothers: 
"Mary Bell was hired out by the year to take care of three children starting when she was seven. John Mullanphy noted that he had lived with him a four-year-old mulatto girl, whom he willed to the Sisters of Charity in the event of his death. George Morton sold his daughter Ellen 'a certain Mulatto girl a slave about fourteen years of age named Sally, being the child of a certain Negro woman named Ann'." In 1854 Georgia was the first and only state to pass a law that put conditions of sales that separated mothers and their children. Children under five could not be sold away from their mothers, "unless such division cannot in any wise be [e]ffected without such separation.'"

Slave girls in North America often worked within the domestic sphere, providing household help. White families sought the help of a "girl", an "all-purpose tool" in family life.  Although the word "girl" applied to any working female without children, slaves were preferred because in the long run, they cost less. These enslaved girls were usually very young, anywhere from nine years of age to their mid-teens. Heavy household work was assigned to the "girl" and was therefore stigmatized as "negroes’" work. A "girl" was an essential source of help to white families, rural and urban, middle class, and aspiring. She provided freedom for daughters to devote themselves to their self-development and relieved mothers from exhausting labor while requiring no financial or emotional maintenance, "no empathy."

In antebellum America, as in the past (from the initial African-European contact in North America), black women were deemed to be governed by their libidos and portrayed as "Jezebel character[s]...in every way the counterimage of the mid-nineteenth-century ideal of the Victorian lady."

Enslaved women in every state of the antebellum union considered freedom, but it was a livelier hope in the North than in most of the South. Many slaves sought their freedom through self-purchase, the legal system of freedom suits, and as runaways, sometimes resulting in the separation of children and parents. "Unfinished childhoods and brutal separations punctuated the lives of most African American girls, and mothers dreamed of freedom that would not impose more losses on their daughters."

Antebellum South

After the Revolution, Southern plantation owners imported a massive number of new slaves from Africa and the Caribbean until the United States banned the import of slaves in 1808. More importantly, more than one million slaves were transported in forced migration in the domestic slave trade, from the Upper South to the Deep South, most by slave traders—either overland where they were held for days in chained coffles, or by the coastwise trade and ships. The majority of slaves in the Deep South, men, and women, worked on cotton plantations. Cotton was the leading cash crop during this time, but slaves also worked on rice, corn, sugarcane, and tobacco plantations, clearing new land, digging ditches, cutting and hauling wood, slaughtering livestock, and making repairs to buildings and tools. Black women also cared for their children and managed the bulk of the housework and domestic chores. Living with the dual burdens of racism and sexism, enslaved women in the South held roles within the family and community that contrasted sharply with more traditional or upper-class American women's roles.

Young girls generally started working well before boys, with many working before age seven.  Although fieldwork was traditionally considered to be "men's work," different estimates conclude that between 63-80 percent of women worked in the fields.  Adult female work depended greatly upon plantation size. On small farms, women and men performed similar tasks, while on larger plantations, males were given more physically demanding work. Few of the chores performed by enslaved women took them off the plantation. Therefore they were less mobile than enslaved men, who often assisted their masters in the transportation of crops, supplies, and other materials, and were often hired out as artisans and craftsmen. Women also worked in the domestic sphere as servants, cooks, seamstresses, and nurses. Although a female slave's labor in the field superseded childrearing in importance, the responsibilities of childbearing and childcare greatly circumscribed the life of an enslaved woman. This also explains why female slaves were less likely to run away than men.

Many female slaves were the object of severe sexual exploitation; often bearing the children of their white masters, master's sons, or overseers. Slaves were prohibited from defending themselves against any type of abuse, including sexual, at the hands of white men. If a slave attempted to defend herself, she was often subjected to further beatings by the master or even by the mistress.
Black females, some of them children, were forced into sexual relationships for their white owners' pleasure and profit: attempting to keep the slave population growing by his own doing, and not by importing more slaves from Africa. Even Thomas Jefferson, 3rd President of the United States, is believed to have fathered six mixed-race children (four survived to adulthood) with one of his female slaves, Sally Hemings, a woman three-quarters white and half-sister to his late wife, who served as the widower's concubine for more than two decades. In the case of Harriet Jacobs, author of Incidents in the Life of a Slave Girl, her enslaver, Dr. James Norcom, had sexually harassed her for years. Even after she had two children of her own, he threatened to sell them if she denied his sexual advances. Although Harriet Jacobs managed to escape to the North with her children, the Fugitive Slave Act of 1850 still put their freedom at risk due to Dr. Norcom's family continuing to pursue her.

Emancipation and the ending of slavery

Slavery was abolished in the United States in 1865 due to the ratification of the 13th Amendment. In 1868, the 14th Amendment extended citizenship rights to African Americans.
 
Although emancipation freed black women from slavery, it also heightened the inequality between black women and black men. No longer servants to slave owners, black women were contractual servants to their husbands due to the patriarchal principles governing the role of women in marriage.

Notable enslaved women

 Ellen Craft (1826–1897) was a slave from Macon, Georgia who posed as a white male planter to escape from slavery. She escaped to the North in December 1848 by traveling openly by train and steamboat with her husband, who acted as her slave servant; they reached Philadelphia and freedom on Christmas Day.
 Harriet Jacobs (1813 or 1815 – March 7, 1897), author of Incidents in the Life of a Slave Girl, now considered an "American classic".
 Harriet Tubman (born Araminta Harriet Ross; 1820 – March 10, 1913) was an African-American abolitionist, humanitarian, and Union spy during the American Civil War. Born into slavery, Tubman escaped and subsequently made more than thirteen missions to rescue more than 70 slaves; she guided refugees along the network of antislavery activists and safe houses known as the Underground Railroad. She later helped John Brown recruit men for his raid on Harpers Ferry, and in the post-war era struggled for women's suffrage.
 Lucy Terry (c. 1730–1821) is the author of the oldest known work of literature by an African American.
 Margaret Garner (called Peggy) (c. 1833/1834-c.1858) was an enslaved African American woman in pre-Civil War United States who was notorious—or celebrated—for killing her own daughter after being captured following her escape, rather than allowing the child to be returned to slavery.
 Phillis Wheatley (May 8, 1753 – December 5, 1784) was the first African-American poet and the first African-American woman to publish a book.
 Sojourner Truth (c. 1797 – November 26, 1883) was the self-given name, from 1843 onward, of Isabella Baumfree, an African-American abolitionist and women's rights activist. Truth was born into slavery in Swartekill, Ulster County, New York. In 1826, she escaped with her infant daughter to freedom. After going to court to recover her son, she became the first black woman to win such a case against a white man. Her best-known extemporaneous speech on gender inequalities, "Ain't I a Woman?", was delivered in 1851 at the Ohio Women's Rights Convention in Akron, Ohio. During the Civil War, Truth helped recruit black troops for the Union Army; after the war, she tried unsuccessfully to secure land grants from the federal government for former slaves.

See also

 History
 Slavery among Native Americans
 Slavery in the colonial history of the United States
 Colonial American bastardy laws
 History of sexual slavery in the United States
 Enslaved women's resistance in the United States and Caribbean 
 Human trafficking in the United States

 Marriage and procreation
 History of sexual slavery in the United States
 Marriage of enslaved people (United States)
 Slave breeding in the United States
 Partus sequitur ventrem
 Children of the plantation

Other
 The Bondwoman's Narrative
 Industrial slave
 Slave insurance in the United States
 African-American Women Work Songs

References

Further reading
 Adams, Catherine, and Elizabeth H. Pleck. Love of freedom: Black women in colonial and revolutionary New England (Oxford UP, 2010).
 Bell, Karen Cook. Running from Bondage: Enslaved Women and Their Remarkable Fight for Freedom in Revolutionary America (Cambridge UP, 2021). excerpt
 Berkin, Carol. Revolutionary Mothers: Women in the Struggle for America's Independence (2005) online
 Berry, Daina Ramey. "Swing the sickle for the harvest is ripe": gender and slavery in antebellum Georgia (U of Illinois Press, 2007). 
 Camp, Stephanie M. H. Closer to Freedom: Enslaved Women and Everyday Resistance in the Plantation South (U of North Carolina Press, 2004).
 Cooper, Abigail. "'Away I Goin’to Find my Mamma': Self-Emanicipation, Migration, and Kinship in Refugee Camps in the Civil War Era." Journal of African American History 102.4 (2017): 444-467.
 Dunaway, Wilma. The African-American Family in Slavery and Emancipation (Cambridge UP, 2003).
 Feinstein, Rachel. "Intersectionality and the role of white women: an analysis of divorce petitions from slavery." Journal of Historical Sociology 30.3 (2017): 545-560.
 Fox-Genovese, Elizabeth. Within the Plantation Household: Black and White Women of the Old South (U of North Carolina Press, 1988). online
 Fraser, Rebecca J. Courtship and Love among the Enslaved in North Carolina (U Press of Mississippi, 2007).
 Frederickson, Mary E. and Delores M. Walters, eds. Gendered Resistance: Women, Slavery and the Legacy of Margaret Garner (University of Illinois Press, 2013).

 Glymph, Thavolia, et al. Out of the House of Bondage: The Transformation of the Plantation Household (Cambridge UP, 2008). online
 Gutman, Herbert G. The Black Family in Slavery and Freedom, 1750-1925 (Vintage, 1976). online
 Hilde, Libra R. Slavery, fatherhood, and paternal duty in African American communities over the long nineteenth century (UNC Press Books, 2020).
 Hudson Jr, Larry E., ed. Working toward freedom: Slave society and domestic economy in the American South (U of Rochester Press, 1994).
 Hunter, Tara W. To ‘Joy My Freedom': Southern Black Women’s Lives and Labors After the Civil War. (Harvard UP, 1997. 
 Jennings, Thelma. "'Us Colored Women Had to Go Though a Plenty': Sexual Exploitation of African-American Slave Women." Journal of Women's History 1.3 (1990): 45-74.

 King, Wilma. “‘Prematurely Knowing of Evil Things’: The Sexual Abuse of African American Girls and Young Women in Slavery and Freedom.” Journal of African American History 99, no. 3 (Summer 2014): 173-96.
 Malone, Ann Patton. Sweet Chariot: Slave Family and Household Structure in Nineteenth Century Louisiana (U of North Carolina Press, 1992).

 Martin, Joan. More than chains and toil: A Christian work ethic of enslaved women (John Knox Press, 2000).
 Miller, Melinda C. "Destroyed by slavery? Slavery and African American family formation following emancipation." Demography 55.5 (2018): 1587-1609.
 Morgan, Philip D. Slave counterpoint: Black culture in the eighteenth-century Chesapeake and Lowcountry (UNC Press Books, 2012).
 Nunley, Tamika Y. "Thrice Condemned: Enslaved Women, Violence, and the Practice of Leniency in Antebellum Virginia Courts." Journal of Southern History 87.1 (2021): 5-34. online
 Nunley, Tamika Y. At the Threshold of Liberty: Women, Slavery, and Shifting Identities in Washington, DC (UNC Press Books, 2021). excerpt
 O'Neil, Patrick W. "'Marriage Trauma' and Homosocial First Aid: Surveillance and Submission among Slaveholding Women." Journal of Women's History 29.2 (2017): 109-131.

 Pargas, Damian Alan. "‘Various means of providing for their own tables’: Comparing Slave Family Economies in the Antebellum South." American Nineteenth Century History 7.3 (2006): 361-387.
 Pinto, Samantha. Infamous Bodies: Early Black Women’s Celebrity and the Afterlives of Rights (Duke UP, 2020).

 Saxton, Martha. Being good: Women's moral values in early America (Macmillan, 2004).
 Schwalm, Leslie. A Hard Fight for We: Women’s Transition from Slavery to Freedom in South Carolina (U of Illinois Press, 1997).
 Schwartz, Marie Jenkins. Born in bondage: Growing up enslaved in the antebellum South (Harvard UP, 2009).
 Smithers, Gregory D. Slave Breeding: Sex, Violence and Memory in African American History U Press of Florida, 2012).
 Sommerville, Diane Miller. Rape and Race in the Nineteenth-Century South (U of North Carolina Press, 2004). 
 Stevenson, Brenda E. Life in Black and White: family and community in the slave south (Oxford UP, 1997).
 Weiner, Marli Frances. Mistresses and Slaves: Plantation Women in South Carolina, 1830-80 (U of Illinois Press, 1998).
 Wells-Oghoghomeh, Alexis. The Souls of Womenfolk: The Religious Cultures of Enslaved Women in the Lower South (UNC Press Books, 2021).
 West, Emily with Knight, R. J. “'Mothers’ Milk': Slavery, Wet-Nursing, and Black and White Women in the Antebellum South.” Journal of Southern History 83#1` (2017): 37-68. 
 West, Emily. Chains of Love: Slave Couples in Antebellum South Carolina (U of Illinois Press, 2014).
 White, Deborah Gray. “Female Slaves: Sex Roles and Status in the Antebellum Plantation South.” Journal of Family History 8#3 (1983): 48-61. 
 White, Deborah Gray. Ar'n't I a woman?: Female slaves in the plantation South (WW Norton & Company, 1999).

Historiography and memory
 McElya, Micki.  Clinging to Mammy: The Faithful Slave in Twentieth-Century America (Harvard UP, 2007); on 20th century construed white memories of happy times with slave women.

 West, Emily. "Reflections on the History and Historians of the black woman’s role in the community of slaves: enslaved women and intimate partner sexual violence." American Nineteenth Century History 19.1 (2018): 1-21. online

History of the United States
Slavery in the United States
Women in society
Women in the United States